The Pontiac Executive is an automobile model that was produced by Pontiac from 1967 to 1970.

The Executive name replaced Pontiac's long running mid-range Star Chief, beginning for 1966 when all Pontiacs in this range were named Star Chief Executive for this one year only, before the series became simply the Executive for 1967. 
Executives featured more deluxe trim, more standard amenities and a longer wheelbase and overall length than the lower-priced Catalina models, but were not quite as luxurious as the top-line Bonneville, whose wheelbase and other dimensions the Executive shared. 

The standard transmission each year was a three-speed manual with column shift, with a floor-mounted four-speed with Hurst shifter optional in 1967 and 1968. However, 98 percent of Executives were equipped with the three-speed Turbo Hydra-Matic automatic during the model's four-year run. 

Executives were available as a four-door pillared sedan, two-door hardtop coupe, four-door hardtop sedan, and Safari station wagons in two and three-seat versions. The Executive Safari wagons differed from the Catalina and Bonneville Safari wagons by featuring simulated wood paneling. No Executive convertibles were offered.

Total output of the Executive was: 
1967: 35,491 units
1968: 32,597 units
1969: 25,845 units
1970: 21,936 units

Through its four years, the Executive was the lowest-volume full-size Pontiac. It was replaced for 1971 by the Pontiac Bonneville.

References

Executive
Rear-wheel-drive vehicles
Full-size vehicles
Coupés
Sedans
Station wagons
Cars introduced in 1966
1970s cars
Motor vehicles manufactured in the United States